Pi Andromedae (Pi And, π Andromedae, π And) is the Bayer designation for a binary star system in the northern constellation of Andromeda. With an apparent visual magnitude of 4.4, it is visible to the naked eye.

The pair is classified as a blue-white B-type main sequence dwarf, with an apparent magnitude of +4.34. It is a spectroscopic binary with an orbital period of 143.6 days and an eccentricity of 0.56. 

The spectroscopic binary forms a triple system with BD+32 102, a magnitude 8.6 star located 35.9 arcseconds away. At 55 arcseconds separation is an 11th magnitude companion that is just located on the same line of sight, but at a very different distance from us.

Naming

References

External links
 Image Pi Andromedae

003369
Andromedae, Pi
Andromedae, 29
Andromeda (constellation)
B-type main-sequence stars
Spectroscopic binaries
002912
0154
BD+32 0101